Evita is a concept album released in 1976 and produced by Andrew Lloyd Webber and Tim Rice. Having successfully launched their previous show, Jesus Christ Superstar, on record in 1970, Lloyd Webber and Rice returned to the format for Evita. The album was recorded at Olympic Studios in London from April to September 1976 and released in the United Kingdom on 19 November 1976.

Background
Elements of the original plotline on this album were removed before the show was staged in London in 1978. "Che" here was much more explicitly based on Che Guevara, including a subplot about Guevara's failed efforts to market the insecticide Vendaval, most significantly highlighted in the song "The Lady's Got Potential". The track was cut from the score and a new song written to include the key plotline of Juan Perón's rise to power: "The Art of the Possible".

The libretto and synopsis record "Part One" ending after the balcony scene following "Don't Cry for Me, Argentina" and "Part Two" beginning with "High Flying, Adored". On both the original LP and subsequent compact disc releases, though, the recording is split such that the balcony scene begins the second half. This split point was retained for the London stage production.

As well as producing the album, Lloyd Webber and Rice also performed on the recording. Rice's principal role was as one of the army officers on the track "Rainbow Tour" and Lloyd Webber played keyboards. In his autobiography, Rice quotes the production cost of the album at £74,827.83; around five times that of the Superstar concept album.

Packaging
The gatefold album was released with a monochromatic sleeve, simply black text and photographs on a white background. The cover had the name "Evita" written in a cursive font across a line drawn heart and the subtitle "An opera based on the life story of Eva Peron 1919-1952" below. A glossy brochure was included that contained the credits, libretto and a synopsis, with photographs of the cast and producers by Lord Snowdon and others, collected by the film director Carlos Pasini, of Eva Perón.

The album was relaunched on compact disc in 1996 as the "20th Anniversary Edition" with the cover printed on a silver, blue metalised paper rather than the original white.

Song list

Side breaks are from the original LP.  The CD edition combines sides 1 and 2 on its first disc, and 3 and 4 on its second.

Side One
"A Cinema in Buenos Aires, 1952"
"Requiem for Evita" / "Oh What a Circus"
"On This Night of a Thousand Stars" / "Eva and Magaldi" / "Eva, Beware of the City"
"Buenos Aires"
"Goodnight and Thank You"
Side Two
"The Lady's Got Potential"
"Charity Concert" / "I'd Be Surprisingly Good for You"
"Another Suitcase in Another Hall"
"Dangerous Jade"
"A New Argentina"
Side Three
"On the Balcony of the Casa Rosada" / "Don't Cry for Me Argentina"
"High Flying, Adored"
"Rainbow High"
"Rainbow Tour"
"The Actress Hasn't Learned the Lines (You'd Like to Hear)"
"And the Money Kept Rolling In (And Out)"
Side Four
"Santa Evita"
"Waltz for Eva and Che"
"She is a Diamond"
"Dice Are Rolling" / "Eva's Sonnet"
"Eva's Final Broadcast"
"Montage"
"Lament"

Cast

Julie Covington - Eva Perón
Paul Jones - Juan Perón
C.T. Wilkinson (Colm Wilkinson) - Che (Che Guevara in the later stage productions but not credited as such on this recording)
Tony Christie - Agustin Magaldi
Barbara Dickson - Mistress
Mike Smith - Dolan Getta (a trade union leader)
Mike d'Abo - Getta's sidekick
Christopher Neil - Eva Perón Fund Manager (and backing vocals on "Another Suitcase in Another Hall")

Musicians

Peter van Hooke - drums, percussion
Neil Hubbard - guitar
Andrew Lloyd Webber - keyboards
Hank B. Marvin - guitar
Henry McCullough - guitar
Chris Mercer - saxophone
Mike Moran - keyboards
Joe Moretti - guitar
Barry Morgan - drums, percussion
Anne Odell - keyboards
Brian Odgers - bass guitar
Simon Phillips - drums, percussion
Ray Russell - guitar
David Snell - harp
Richard Windmann - bass guitar

The recording also featured The London Philharmonic Orchestra, conducted by Anthony Bowles.

Charts

Weekly charts

Year-end charts

Certification

Production credits
Producers - Andrew Lloyd Webber and Tim Rice
Engineer - David Hamilton Smith
Assistant engineers - Jeremy Gee and Anton Matthews
Executive producer - David Land
Orchestrations - Andrew Lloyd Webber
Musical co-ordinator - Alan Doggett
Mastering Engineer - Denis Blackham

Credits per AllMusic.

See also
 Evita (musical)
 Evita (film)

References

1976 albums
Concept albums
Rock operas
Albums produced by Andrew Lloyd Webber
Albums produced by Tim Rice
Albums recorded at Morgan Sound Studios